Melaleuca polycephala is a shrub in the myrtle family, Myrtaceae, and is endemic to the south-west of Western Australia. It is a sparsely foliaged, twiggy shrub with deep purple flowers in spring.

Description

The flowers are arranged in heads on the ends of branches which continue to grow after flowering. The stamens are in five bundles around the flowers, each bundle containing 3 stamens.

Taxonomy and naming
Melaleuca polycephala was first formally described in 1867 by George Bentham in Flora Australiensis. The specific epithet (polycephala) is derived from the Greek words πολύς (polús) meaning “many" and κεφαλή (kephalḗ) meaning "head" in reference to the large number of flower heads in examples of this species.

Distribution and habitat
This melaleuca occurs in and between the Gnowangerup, Pingrup and Jerramungup districts in the Esperance Plains and Mallee biogeographic regions. It grows in clay and sandy clay.

Conservation
Melaleuca polycephala is classified as "Priority Three" by the Government of Western Australia Department of Parks and Wildlife meaning that it is known from only a few locations and is not currently in imminent danger.

References

polycephala
Myrtales of Australia
Plants described in 1867
Endemic flora of Western Australia